Brisker is Rabbinic name and Jewish surname of:
 Reb Chaim Brisker (Soloveitchik) (1853–1918), rabbi and Talmudist
 Brisk tradition and Soloveitchik dynasty ("Brisker")
 Brisker method, a reductionistic approach to Talmud study innovated by Rabbi Chaim Soloveitchik of Brisk
  - One of the founders of Tel Aviv and Ramat Gan
  - writer, playwright, journalist, radio broadcaster and Hebrew editor
 Brisker Rov ("rabbi of/from Brisk") (1886 in Valozhyn – 1959)
 Gordon Brisker (1937–2004), American jazz tenor saxophonist
Jaquan Brisker (born 1999), American football player
 John Brisker (born 1947), American basketball player
Mark Brisker (born 1969), American-Israeli basketball player
 Michael Brisker (born 1998), Israeli basketball player

Jewish surnames
Surnames of Belarusian origin
Toponymic surnames
Yiddish-language surnames